Alemão, sometimes Alemao (meaning "German" in Portuguese) may refer to:

Alemão (footballer, born 1904) (1904–1975), full name Sylvio Serpa, Brazilian footballer
Alemão (footballer, born 1961), full name Ricardo Rogério de Brito, Brazilian footballer
Alemão (footballer, born 1975), full name Cidimar Aparecido Ernegas, Brazilian footballer
Alemão (footballer, born February 1982), full name Paulo Jorge Sousa Vieira, Portuguese footballer
Alemão (footballer, born November 1982), full name Everson Arantes de Oliveira, Brazilian footballer
Alemão (footballer, born 1984) (1984–2007), full name Carlos Adriano de Jesus Soares, Brazilian footballer
Alemão (footballer, born 1986), full name Rafael Berger, Brazilian footballer
Alemão (footballer, born May 1986), Leonardo Robert Fayão, Brazilian football centre-back
Alemão (footballer, born 1989), full name José Carlos Tofolo Júnior, Brazilian footballer
Alemão (footballer, born May 1990), full name Jucimar José Teixeira, Brazilian footballer
Alemão (footballer, born October 1990), full name Fagner Ironi Daponte, Brazilian footballer
Alemão (footballer, born 1992), full name Guilherme António de Souza, Brazilian footballer
Alemão (footballer, born 2002), full name Matheus Diogo Desevinka de Oliveira, Brazilian footballer
Alemão (futsal player) (born 1976), full name Júlio César Simonato Cordeiro, Brazilian-born Spanish futsal player
Churchill Alemao (born 1949), Goan Catholic politician from India
Complexo do Alemão, slum district in Rio de Janeiro, Brazil
Alemão (film), a 2014 film

Ethnonymic surnames